Richard White (born November 4, 1952) is an American lumberman and politician from Kentucky. He is a Republican and represents District 99 in the State House. White won the special election for House District 99 on February 25, 2020, defeating Democrat Bill Redwine.

In February 2022, White was hospitalized under critical condition in Frankfort, Kentucky for internal bleeding.

References 

Living people
Republican Party members of the Kentucky House of Representatives
21st-century American politicians
1952 births